The 2014 Conference USA men's basketball tournament was the post-season men's basketball tournament for Conference USA, held March 11–15, 2014, in El Paso, Texas, at Don Haskins Center.

Seeds

Schedule

Bracket

References

Conference USA men's basketball tournament
Tournament
Conference USA men's basketball tournament
Conference USA men's basketball tournament